William Harding (1883 – 1967) was an English footballer who played for Stoke.

Career
Turner was born in Stoke-upon-Trent and played amateur football with Wolstanton RS before joining Stoke in 1908. He played in five first team matches during the 1908–09 season before returning to amateur football with Ribbendale.

Career statistics

References

English footballers
Stoke City F.C. players
1883 births
1967 deaths
Association football defenders